At the time of its closure, Thomas Cook Airlines flew to the following destinations throughout Africa, Asia, Europe and North America.

List

References

Lists of airline destinations